Macromphalina jibacoa is a species of very small sea snail, a marine gastropod mollusk in the family Vanikoridae.

Distribution
This species occurs in the following areas:
 Caribbean Sea
 Cuba
 Gulf of Mexico

Description 
The maximum recorded shell length is 1.82 mm.

Habitat 
The minimum recorded depth for this species is 4 m; maximum recorded depth is 4 m.

References

Vanikoridae
Gastropods described in 1998